Balen may refer to:

Places
 Balen, a municipality in Belgium
 Saas-Balen, a municipality in Switzerland

People
 Balen Shah (born 1990), Nepalese rapper and politician
 Hendrick van Balen (1574–1632), a Flemish artist
 Mathias Balen (1611–1691), a Dutch historian
 Matthijs Balen (1684–1766), a Dutch painter
 Viena Balen (born 1986) Croatian road cyclist

Other
 Balen Report, a document examining the BBC's coverage of the Israeli-Palestinian conflict